Sethubandhanam is a bridge built by the Vanara army of Rama in the Ramayana. 

Sethubandhanam may also refer to:

 Rama Setu (Ramayana), another term for the above
 Adam's Bridge or Rama Sethu, shoals between India and Sri Lanka, identified with the bridge in Ramayana
 Sethu Bandhanam (1937 film), 1937 Indian Tamil-language film
 Sethu Bandhanam (1946 film), Indian 1946 Telugu-language film
 Sethubandhanam (film), 1974 Indian Malayalam-language film by J. Sasikumar
 Sethubandhanam at Sreeraman Chira Chemmappilly, re-enactment of the scene from Ramayana held annually in Kerala, India

See also 
Ram Setu (film), 2022 Indian film about the bridge
 Adams Bridge (disambiguation)
 Sethu (disambiguation)
 SETU (disambiguation)
 Sethupathi (disambiguation)